Arend may refer to:

Arend (locomotive), one of the two first steam locomotives in the Netherlands
Arend, Iran, a village
Arendsee (lake) or Lake Arend, Saxony-Anhalt, Germany
50P/Arend or Comet Arend, a periodic comet
De Arend (disambiguation), the name of various Dutch windmills
Arend (given name)
Arend (surname)

See also
 Arent (disambiguation)
 Arends, a Dutch surname
 Arents, a Dutch and German surname 
 Arent Arentsz (1585–1631), Dutch painter
 Hannah Arendt (1906–1975), German-American philosopher and political theorist